California's 19th congressional district is a congressional district in the U.S. state of California, currently represented by .

Following redistricting in 2021, the district includes most of Santa Cruz County and parts of Santa Clara County, Monterey County and San Luis Obispo County. The new 19th district includes the south side of San Jose and the entire cities of Santa Cruz, Monterey, Seaside, Paso Robles, and Atascadero.

For much of the 20th century prior to the early 1990s, the district had encompassed areas to the south and much of Los Angeles County, California. Gradually it was redefined to take in central and northern counties instead.

Recent election results from statewide races

Composition

As of the 2020 redistricting, California's 19th congressional district is located on the Central Coast. It encompasses most of Santa Cruz County, the interior of Santa Clara County, the north of San Luis Obispo County, and the coast of Monterey County.

Santa Clara County is split between this county, the 16th district, and the 18th district. The 19th and 16th are partitioned by Old Santa Cruz Highway, Aldercroft Hts Rd, Weaver Rd, Soda Springs Rd, Love Harris Rd, Pheasant Creek, Guadalupe Creek, Guadalupe Mines Rd, Oak Canyon Dr, Coleman Rd, Meridian Ave, Highway G8, Guadalupe River, W Capitol Expressway, Senter Rd, Sylvandale Ave, Yerba Buena Rd, Silver Creek Rd, and E Capitol Expressway. The 19th and 18th are partitioned by Pajaro River, Highway 129, W Beach St, Lee Rd, Highway 1, Harkins Slough Rd, Harkins Slough, Old Adobe Rd, Corralitos Creek, Varin Rd, Pioneer Rd, Green Valley Rd, Casserly Rd, Mt Madonna Rd. The 19th district takes in the south west section of the city of San Jose.

Monterey County is split between this district and the 18th district. They are partitioned by Union Pacific, Highway G12, Elkhorn Rd, Echo Valley Rd, Maher Rd, Maher Ct, La Encina Dr, Crazy Horse Canyon Rd, San Juan Grade Rd, Highway 101, Espinosa Rd, Castroville Blvd, Highway 156, Highway 1, Tembladero Slough, Highway 183, Cooper Rd, Blanco Rd, Salinas River, Davis Rd, Hitchcock Rd, Highway 68, E Blanco Rd, Nutting St, Abbott St, Highway G17, Limekiln Creek, Likekiln Rd, Rana Creek, Tularcitos Creek, Highway G16, Tassajara Rd, Camp Creek, Lost Valley Creek, Lost Valley Conn, N Coast Rdg, 2 Central Coa, Cone Peak Rd, Nacimiento Fergusson Rd, Los Bueyes Creek, and the Monterey County Southern border. The 19th district takes in the cities of Monterey, Seaside, Pacific Grove, and Marina, as well as most of the census-designated place Prunedale.

San Luis Obispo County is split between this district and the 24th district. They are partitioned by Highway 1, Cayucos Creek Rd, Thunder Canyon Rd, Old Creek Rd, Santa Rita Rd, Tara Creek, Fuentes Rd, Highway 41, San Miguel Rd, Palo Verde Rd, Old Morro Rd, Los Osos Rd, San Rafael Rd, Atascadero Ave, San Antonio Rd, N Santa Margarita Rd, Santa Clara Rd, Rocky Canyon Truck Trail, Highway 229, Lion Ridge Rd, O’Donovan Rd, Highway 58, Calf Canyon Highway, La Panza Rd, Upton Canyon Rd, Camatta Creek Rd, San Juan Creek, and Bitterwater Rd. The 19th district takes in the cities of Atascadero and Paso Robles.

Cities & CDP with 10,000 or more people
 San Jose - 1,013,240
 Santa Cruz - 62,956
 Seaside - 32,366
 Paso Robles - 32,153
 Monterey - 30,218
 Atascadero - 29,773
 Marina - 22,781
 Prunedale - 20,560
 Pacific Grove - 15,413
 Scotts Valley - 12,224

List of members representing the district

Election results

1932

1934

1936

1938

1940

1942

1944

1946

1948

1950

1952

1954

1956

1958

1960

1962

1964

1966

1968

1970

1972

1974

1976

1978

1980

1982

1984

1986

1988

1990

1992

1994

1996

1998

2000

2002

2004

2006

2008

2010
This election was the final election before 19th district was redrawn. Jeff Denham won his 2012 re-election as a representative of the 10th district.

2012

2014

2016

2018

2020

See also
List of United States congressional districts

References

External links
GovTrack.us: California's 19th congressional district
RAND California Election Returns: District Definitions
California Voter Foundation map - CD19

19
Government of Fresno County, California
Government of Madera County, California
Government of Mariposa County, California
Government of Stanislaus County, California
Government of Tuolumne County, California
Constituencies established in 1933
1933 establishments in California